San Cosme y Damián is a district in the Itapúa Department of Paraguay. Located 80 km west of Encarnación, it is close to places like Ayolas, General Artigas or Isla Apipé, in Southern Paraguay and Northern Argentina, along the Paraná River.

Sources 
World Gazeteer: Paraguay– World-Gazetteer.com

Districts of Itapúa Department